This article provides details of international football games played by the Abkhazia national football team from 2012 to 2019.

Results

2012

2013

2014

2015

2016

2017

2018

2019

Record by opponent

See also
 Abkhazia national football team results (unofficial matches)
 Abkhazia national football team results (2020–present)

Notes

References

Football in Abkhazia